The Jeonju Bibimbap Festival  (Hangeul: 전주 비빔밥 축제 ) is a Korean Food Festival located in Jeonju city. It takes place at the Jeonju Hanok Village, and it centers on the popular dish bibimbap, a bowl of rice topped with diverse vegetables, beef and chili pepper paste. The festival has been celebrated annually since 2007.

Overview 
The festival usually takes place during the month of October every year. It showcases the most iconic dish of the region, bibimbap, and a favorite among tourists. Visitors to the festival can participate in cooking competitions, sample local recipes, and learn how to cook traditional bibimbap. They can also participate in folk games, enjoy concerts, and visit a night market.

The festival has been reported to draw 150,00 citizens and tourists. Despite being cancelled in 2020 due to the COVID-19 pandemic, in 2021 edition was held with a four-week schedule under the title of World Bibim Week.

In 2022 the festival will be held offline from the 6th to the 10th of October.

See Also 

 Food Festivals in South Korea.

References 

 
South Korean cuisine
Food
Cultural festivals in South Korea